Levanto  may refer to the following places:

Levanto, Liguria, a comune in the Province of La Spezia, Italy
Levanto District, a district in the Province of Chachapoyas, Amazonas, Peru